Josef Haas (born 3 August 1937) is a former a Swiss cross-country skier who competed in the late 1960s. He won the 50 km bronze at the 1968 Winter Olympics in Grenoble. Haas was the first Swiss to earn a cross-country skiing Olympic medal.

External links
 
 

Cross-country skiers at the 1968 Winter Olympics
1937 births
Living people
Swiss male cross-country skiers
Olympic bronze medalists for Switzerland
Olympic medalists in cross-country skiing
Medalists at the 1968 Winter Olympics
20th-century Swiss people